An exopolymer is a biopolymer that is secreted by an organism into the environment (i.e. external to the organism).  These exopolymers include the biofilms produced by bacteria to anchor them and protect them from environmental conditions. One type of expolymer, Transparent Exopolymers (TEP), found in both marine and aquatic ecosystems, are planktonic acidic polysaccharides of a gel-like consistency, originally defined by their ability to be stained visible by acidic Alcian Blue. Their free-floating characteristic sets TEPs aside from other extracellular polymeric substance subgroups where exopolymers exists as cell coating, dissolved slime or as part of biofilm matrices.

The formation of Transparent Exopolymer Particles(TEP) is mainly due to the abiotic coagulation of dissolved carbohydrates, which is secreted by the phytoplankton communities. Transparent Exopolymer Particles ((TEP) have the ability to form larger aggregates because of their strong surface active properties or “stickiness”. This particular property of TEP allows them to perform as a glue matrix for other solid particles including detritus.

Transparent Exopolymer Particles (TEP) is also a carbon source for bacteria, which plays a significant role in affecting the food web structure and the carbon cycle in the ocean. Additionally, the conversion of dissolved organic carbon (DOC) to particulate organic carbon (POC) is an aggregation process that is due to TEP formation.

References

Biomolecules
Polymers